Hush is a collaborative album by vocalist Bobby McFerrin and cellist Yo-Yo Ma. It was released on the Sony Masterworks label in 1992. The pair first met at a 1988 celebration of Leonard Bernstein.

The album peaked at No. 93 on the Billboard 200.

Production
The album was produced by McFerrin and Steven Epstein. McFerrin wrote five of its songs; the collaborators adapted three Johann Sebastian Bach compositions. According to McFerrin, Ma was hesitant to improvise during the recording sessions.

Critical reception

The Indianapolis Star wrote: "Apart from a rousing indulgence in country fiddle-music licks on 'Hoedown!', McFerrin's own compositions here lean toward the artfully overdubbed New Age." The St. Petersburg Times praised "the album's best track, McFerrin's beautifully melodic 'Stars'." The Washington Post admired "the winning combination of Ma's unerring, often deeply expressive touch and McFerrin's wit, whimsy, resourcefulness and sheer musicality."

Track listing 

 "Grace" (McFerrin) – 3:54
 "Double Mandolin Concerto in G, RV 532" Andante (Vivaldi) – 4:03
 "The Flight of the Bumblebee" (Rimsky-Korsakov) – 1:08
 "Stars" (McFerrin) – 4:04
 "Hush Little Baby" (Trad.) – 2:36
 "Vocalise," song for voice & piano, Op. 34/14 (Rachmaninov) – 6:26
 "Musette for keyboard in D Major (AMN II/22; doubtful), BWV Anh. 126" (J. S. Bach) – 4:12
 "Coyote" (McFerrin) – 2:52
 "Sonata for 2 cellos, No. 10 in G Allegro: Prestissimo" (Barrière) – 2:36
 "Ave Maria" (Gounod / J. S. Bach) – 2:37
 "Hoedown!" (McFerrin) – 5:38
 "Air" (Orchestral Suite No. 3 in D Major, BWV 1068) (J. S. Bach) – 5:11
 "Good-bye" (McFerrin) – 1:11

Personnel 

 Yo-Yo Ma – cello, liner notes
 Bobby McFerrin – arranger, vocals, co-producer, liner notes

Production 

 Steven Epstein – producer
 Carol Friedman – cover photo
 Linda Goldstein – executive producer
 Chris Tergesen – audio engineer, mixing engineer
 Allen Weinberg – cover design

References

  

Bobby McFerrin albums
Yo-Yo Ma albums
1992 albums
Vocal–instrumental duet albums